The milanesa is a variation of the Lombard veal Milanese, or the Austrian Wiener schnitzel, where generic types of meat breaded cutlet preparations are known as a milanesa.

The milanesa was brought to the Southern Cone by Italian immigrants during the mass emigration that created the Italian diaspora between 1860 and the 1920s. Its name probably reflects an original Milanese preparation, cotoletta alla milanese, which is similar to the Austrian Wiener schnitzel.

A milanesa consists of a thin slice of beef, chicken, fish, veal, or sometimes pork. Each slice is dipped into beaten eggs, seasoned with salt, and other condiments according to the cook's taste (like parsley and garlic). Each slice is then dipped in bread crumbs (or occasionally flour) and shallow-fried in oil, one at a time. Some people prefer to use very little oil and then bake them in the oven as a healthier alternative. A similar dish is the chicken parmigiana.

Variations

By adding tomato paste, mozzarella cheese, and sometimes ham, a dish called milanesa a la napolitana (Milanese in the Neapolitan style) was created. "Neapolitan" is not named for the city of Naples, but because it was first made and sold in Restaurante Napoli owned by Jorge La Grotta in Argentina in the 1940s. The dish is sometimes known as súper milanesa or, when made out of chicken breast, suprema napolitana.

Milanesas are one of the most popular dishes in Argentina and have been described as "one of the quintessential Río de la Plata dishes". They are the legacy of Italian immigrants, who introduced cotoletta alla milanese in the late 19th century and early 20th century. During that time, Argentina experienced a huge European immigration wave, with most immigrants coming from Italy. Milanesas are so ubiquitous to Argentine culture that the country even has a "Day of the Milanesa", celebrated on May 3.

They are frequently served hot with fried or mashed potatoes; this dish is known as milanesa con papas fritas or milanesa con puré. In Argentina and Uruguay, it is often topped with a fried egg, known as milanesa a caballo (milanesa riding horseback), but omits the tomato sauce. They are often eaten cold as a sandwich filling, with salad. Lemon juice and sometimes mayonnaise are commonly used as seasoning.

Milanesa Kaiser, or escalopa as it is known in Chile, is a variant (where normal milanesas are also eaten) reminiscent of cordon bleu or valdostana, with a layer of melted cheese between the beef and a layer of ham. A classic Chilean version is called escalopa a lo pobre, topped with french fries, sautéed onions and fried eggs, akin to lomo a lo pobre.

In Mexico and the Southern United States, milanesas are eaten in some regions, often in a torta (a sandwich made with bolillo or telera bread). In northern Baja California, Sonora, Sinaloa, and Chihuahua (due to U.S influence), it features lettuce, tomato, and mayonnaise like a traditional sandwich, but the milanesa is also common in these regions as the main course of a meal. The milanesa memela napolitana is made with a thick fried tortilla with a milanesa on top, with ham, tomato sauce and grated cheese. In Mexico, milanesa usually refers to the preparation method; any type of meat that is pounded thin, breaded and fried might be referred to as a milanesa. In the northern state of Nuevo León, perhaps due to the influence of German and Czech immigrants, the dish known as milanesa is extremely popular and stands on its own as a main dish in most restaurants. It is usually served with french fries, refried beans, rice, and a lettuce salad.

In Panama, they are most commonly made of thinly sliced beef (usually sirloin steak), but also thin chicken fillet. Lime juice is squeezed over them before serving or eating them, and often they are also seasoned with hot sauce. They are eaten with white rice and other side dishes such as salad, lentils or beans. The latter two are poured over the rice, as they are usually served in Panama while the salad is served off to the side where there is still space left on the plate. When served as sandwiches, they are known as emparedado de milanesa or sandwich de milanesa when tomatoes, onions, lettuce, ketchup or American cheese (queso amarillo i.e. yellow cheese). Pan de molde (sandwich bread) and pan flauta (a Panamanian type of baguette that is thicker and softer) are the types used to make these sandwiches.

In the Philippines, milanesa is known as carne frita (not to be confused with bistek, which is also called "carne frita" in the Philippines), and is cooked in much the same way as described above (meat pounded until thin, flour, egg, breadcrumbs, fried). Admittedly, it is not as popular in the country as it is in South America, and it is served mainly in people's homes, not in restaurants. The families that do eat it usually serve milanesa/carne frita with white rice, a bean stew of some sort (for instance, white beans with a dark leafy green; also fabada), sometimes an American-style potato salad with cut green beans added, and often, chili ketchup or a mayo-ketchup mixed sauce not unlike the Argentine salsa golf. It is almost never served as a sandwich.

In Poland variety of milanesa is commonly known as Kotlet schabowy, which is pork loin pounded with mallet until it becomes thinner and soft, then coated with flour, beaten egg and breadcrumbs and fried on the pan. There's also Kotlet drobiowy made of the chicken or turkey and prepared in similar way, and Kotlet wolowy made of beef steak, pounded, soaked in milk for few hours to tender the meat and then coated in flour, beaten egg and bread crumbs. Polish  Kotlet is traditionally served with cooked potatoes, mashed potatoes, fries, Silesian dumplings, Szałot or rice. Typically sides are traditional Polish salads like mizeria, thinly grated carrot salad, Ćwikła or one of traditional Polish Surówka. The history of the Polish Kotlet dates back to the 19th century.

See also

 Argentine cuisine
 Austrian cuisine
 Bolivian cuisine
 Brazilian cuisine
 Chilean cuisine
 Colombian cuisine
 Italian cuisine
 Mexican cuisine
 Panamanian cuisine
 Paraguayan cuisine
 Peruvian cuisine
 Polish cuisine
 Uruguayan cuisine
 Venezuelan cuisine

Similar dishes:
 Chicken fried steak
 Schnitzel
 Silpancho
 Wiener Schnitzel
 Escalope
 Tonkatsu
 Kotlet schabowy

References

External links

Breaded cutlets
Argentine cuisine
Bolivian cuisine
Brazilian cuisine
Chilean cuisine
Colombian cuisine
Mexican cuisine
Panamanian cuisine
Paraguayan cuisine
Peruvian cuisine
Philippine cuisine
Uruguayan cuisine
Venezuelan cuisine
National dishes
South American cuisine
Latin American cuisine
Central American cuisine